Ischnurges gratiosalis is a moth in the family Crambidae. It was described by Francis Walker in 1859. It is found in Sri Lanka, China, Taiwan and India and on Borneo and the Maldives.

Adults are rose coloured, irregularly varied with yellow, yellowish white and partly clouded with rose colour beneath. The forewings have two vitreous bands, as do the hindwings.

References

Invertebrates of Sri Lanka
Moths described in 1859
Spilomelinae